Bloomfield Football Club (previously known as 24th Old Boys) is a Northern Irish intermediate football club playing in Division 1C of the Northern Amateur Football League. The club formed in the 1922 as the 24th O.B., composed of former members of the 24th Belfast Boys' Brigade company. In 1990, they changed their name to Bloomfield upon joining the Amateur League (having spent some 30 years in the BB Old Boys' Union League. They play their home matches at the Orangefield playing fields complex at Houston Park, Belfast. The first team manager is Billy Carson and is backed up by assistant managers Colin Rooney and Sammy Spence. As well as the first team, there is a second team playing in the NAFL Division 3B and a third team in the premier league of the South Antrim Football League. There are also 6 youth teams ranging from Under 16's down to Under 10's.

References

External links
 Bloomfield Official Club website

Association football clubs in Northern Ireland
Association football clubs in Belfast
Northern Amateur Football League clubs